John Finlayson may refer to:
 John Harvey Finlayson (1843–1915), editor and part-owner of the South Australian Register
 John Finlaison (born John Finlayson, 1783–1860), Scottish government actuary, first president of the Institute of Actuaries
 John Finlayson (disciple) (1770–1854), Scottish writer, London "house agent", disciple of Richard Brothers
 John Finlayson (engraver) (1730–1776), English engraver
 John Alexander Finlayson (1890–1960), member of the New Zealand Legislative Council